CFDS may refer to:
 Canadian Forces Dental Services, in the military of Canada (renamed Royal Canadian Dental Corps) 
 Chartered Financial Divorce Specialist, a Canadian professional designation
 Commission for Dark Skies (CfDS), a British non-profit
 Computational fluid dynamics services, in physics
 Contracts for difference (CFDs), in financial markets
 Centralized Fault Display System, in avionics

See also
 CFD (disambiguation)